Abhay Kumar Patil also popularly known as Abhay Patil (born 1969) is an Indian politician belonging to the Bharatiya Janata Party. He is the Member of Legislative Assembly representing Bharatiya Janata Party Belgaum Dakshin and was also the Member of Legislative Assembly of Bharatiya Janata Party from 2004-2008 where he represented Bagewadi constituency and from 2009-2013 he represented Belagavi Dakshin.

Early life
Born in a family of traditional landlords to Sri. (Late) Bharamagouda Patil and Smt. (Late) Malini Bharamagouda Patil in 1969 at Belagavi, Karnataka, India, Abhay Patil completed his elementary education in the Government School No. 4 and Chintamanrao High School at Shahpur, Belagavi. He pursued technical education and qualified from Bharatesh Industrial Training Institute, Belagavi. He is married to Smt. Preeti and has two children, Anushkh and Aryan. Having been initiated into Indian traditional family values and deeply inspired by his mother's devotion to religious faith, he grew up as an active student and youth leader, taking up numerous social activities and issues of public concern. The turning point in his life was the momentous Ram Mandir movement, where having been inspired by Sri L. K. Advani ji, he decided to choose a life of social activism and work. He was drawn into the fold of Rashtriya Swayamsevak Sangh, the largest voluntary movement of national reconstruction in the world, and completed the Initial Training Camp soon after.

Politics
Abhay Patil's political career began as a Karyakarta in Bharathiya Janata Party (BJP). Being endowed with natural skills of leadership, he rose quickly through the ranks of the cadre by the merit of his abilities and was promoted as the Ward Pramukh and later the Assembly election in-charge of Bagewadi constituency in 1996. His first stint at electoral politics in 1999 from Bagewadi was unsuccessful when he lost the Assembly election. However, having been nominated for the second time in 2004 from the same constituency, he won the election at the age of 35 and was one of the youngest first-generation members of the assembly in India. During 2005–07, he was appointed the National Vice President of Bharathiya Janata Party Yuva Morcha (BJYM), under the Presidentship of Sri. Dharmendra Pradhan (presently, the Hon. Minister for Petroleum and Skill Development).

In 2008, he contested the Assembly elections from Belagavi Dakshin and won with a comfortable lead of 12990 votes. During his term as the MLA, he was appointed the Chairman of the Legislative Assembly's Estimate Committee for two separate terms during 2008-09 and 2012–13, by the Speaker of the Assembly. In 2013, he lost a third consecutive term as an MLA due to the split in the BJP party and lost the election with a narrow margin. However, his growing stature was reflected in his appointment as the Saha Sampark Pramukh of BJP Maha Sampark Abhiyaan of Karnataka's BJP unit.. He won 2018 Assembly elections on 15 May 2018 with a thumping lead of 58692 votes.

Social Leadership
Abhay Patil is one of the most influential and inspirational youth leaders of the region and is the force behind numerous activities, movements, and events promoting Cultural, Educational, National, and Family Values for all sections of society cutting across barriers.

Model Villages
Abhay Patil launched 'Swaccha Abhiyaan' through 'Shramdaan' in Jaffarwadi and Hulikavi villages way back in 2006 as the first step in developing a Model village. Basic facilities such as Drinking water, Toilets, Roads, etc. were provided. Sri. B.S. Chandrashekhar, the Chairman of the Karnataka Legislative Council was impressed with the efforts during his visit and sanctioned solar lamps to every household in the Village of Hulikavi.

Swaccha Seva
Inspired by the reform and the response from the public, Abhay Patil, continues to engage in the Cleaning up of Public places, Gardens, Places of Worship, Crematoriums, Graveyards, etc., every Sunday with a group of youngsters even to this day. He foresaw the Swachhata Abhiyaan, initiated by PM Modi in 2014.

IT Park
Abhay Patil was responsible for taking up the cause of IT park in Belagavi, when he introduced and cleared the private members bill during his tenure as an MLA.

Vision 2040
As a sign of his foresight and in memory of Mahatma Gandhi, he introduced a Private member bill for the development action plan for Belagavi, 'Vision 2040', which was passed unanimously by the Assembly.

IIT
In one of the most unique ideas, Abhay Patil, led the formation of one of the longest human chains in Belagavi in 2011, for drawing the attention of Central Government for IIT Belagavi.

References 

Karnataka MLAs 2004–2007
Karnataka MLAs 2008–2013
Living people
Bharatiya Janata Party politicians from Karnataka
People from Belgaum
1969 births
Karnataka MLAs 2018–2023